Leslie Conway "Lester" Bangs (December 14, 1948 – April 30, 1982) was an American music journalist, critic, author, and musician. He wrote for Creem and Rolling Stone magazines, and was known for his leading influence in rock music criticism. The music critic Jim DeRogatis called him "America's greatest rock critic".

Early life
Bangs was born in Escondido, California. He was the son of Norma Belle (née Clifton) and Conway Leslie Bangs, a truck driver. Both of his parents were from Texas: his father from Enloe and his mother from Pecos County. Norma Belle was a devout Jehovah's Witness. Conway died in a fire when his son was young. When Bangs was 11, he moved with his mother to El Cajon, also in San Diego County. His early interests and influences ranged from the Beats (particularly William S. Burroughs) and jazz musicians John Coltrane and Miles Davis, to comic books and science fiction. He had a connection with The San Diego Door, an underground newspaper of the late 1960s.

Career

Rolling Stone magazine
Bangs became a freelance writer in 1969, after reading an ad in Rolling Stone soliciting readers' reviews. His first accepted piece was a negative review of the MC5 album Kick Out the Jams, which he sent to Rolling Stone with a note requesting, if the magazine were to decline to publish the review, that he be given a reason for the decision; no reply was forthcoming, as the magazine did indeed publish the review.

His 1970 review of Black Sabbath's first album in Rolling Stone was scathing, rating them as imitators of the band Cream:

Bangs wrote about the death of Janis Joplin in 1970 from a drug overdose: "It's not just that this kind of early death has become a fact of life that has become disturbing, but that it's been accepted as a given so quickly."

In 1973, Jann Wenner fired Bangs from Rolling Stone for "disrespecting musicians" after a particularly harsh review of the group Canned Heat.

Creem magazine 
Bangs began freelancing for Detroit-based Creem in 1970. In 1971, he wrote a feature for Creem on Alice Cooper, and soon afterward he moved to Detroit. Named Creem's editor in 1971, Bangs fell in love with Detroit, calling it "rock's only hope", and remained there for five years.

During the early 1970s, Bangs and some other writers at Creem began using the term punk rock to designate the genre of 1960s garage bands and more contemporary acts, such as MC5 and Iggy and the Stooges. Their writings would provide some of the conceptual framework for the later punk and new wave movements that emerged in New York, London, and elsewhere later in the decade. They would be quick to pick up on these new movements at their inception and provide extensive coverage of the phenomenon. Bangs was enamored of the noise music of Lou Reed, and Creem gave significant exposure to artists such as Reed, David Bowie, Roxy Music, Captain Beefheart, Blondie, Brian Eno, and the New York Dolls years earlier than the mainstream press. Bangs wrote the essay/interview "Let Us Now Praise Famous Death Dwarves" about Reed in 1975. Creem was also among the earliest publications to give sizable coverage to hard rock and metal artists such as Motörhead, Kiss, Judas Priest, and Van Halen.

Subsequent career 
After leaving Creem in 1976, he wrote for The Village Voice, Penthouse, Playboy, New Musical Express, and many other publications. He won a 1984 Grammy Award for his liner notes on The Fugs Greatest Hits, Volume 1.

Death
Bangs died in New York City on April 30, 1982, at the age of 33; he was self-medicating a bad case of the flu and accidentally overdosed on dextropropoxyphene (an opioid analgesic), diazepam (a benzodiazepine), and NyQuil.

At the time of his death, Bangs appeared to be listening to music. Earlier that day he had bought a copy of Dare by the English synth-pop band The Human League, according to Jim DeRogatis's well-sourced biography Let It Blurt. Later that night, Bangs's friend found him unresponsive, lying on a couch in his apartment. "Dare was spinning on the turntable, and the needle was stuck on the end groove", DeRogatis wrote.

Writing style and cultural commentary
Bangs's criticism was filled with cultural references, not only to rock music but also to literature and philosophy. His radical and confrontational style influenced others in the punk rock and related social and  political movements. In a 1982 interview, he said,

A performer with his own band, he also appeared on stage with others at times. On one occasion, while the J. Geils Band were playing in concert, Bangs climbed onto the stage, typewriter in hand, and proceeded to type a supposed review of the event, in full view of the audience, banging the keys in rhythm with the music.

In 1979, writing for The Village Voice, Bangs wrote a piece about racism in the punk music scene, called "The White Noise Supremacists", wherein he re-examined his own actions and words, and those of his peers, in light of some bands using Nazi symbolism, and other racist speech and imagery, "for shock value". He came to the painful conclusion that generating outrage for attention wasn't worth the harm it was causing fellow members of the community, and expressed his personal shame and embarrassment about having engaged in these racist behaviors himself. He praised the efforts of  activist groups like Rock Against Racism and Rock Against Sexism as "an attempt at simple decency by a lot of people whom one would think too young and naive to begin to appreciate the contradictions."

Music
Bangs was also a musician. In 1976, he and Peter Laughner recorded an acoustic improvisation in the Creem office. The recording included covers/parodies of songs like "Sister Ray" and "Pale Blue Eyes", both by the Velvet Underground.

In 1977, Bangs recorded, as a solo artist, a 7" vinyl single named "Let It Blurt/Live", mixed by John Cale and released in 1979.

In 1977, at the famous New York City nightclub, CBGB, while Bangs was talking to guitarist Mickey Leigh, Joey Ramone's brother, the idea for a band named "Birdland" came to fruition. Although they both had their roots in jazz, the two wanted to create an old school rock & roll group. Leigh brought in his post-punk band, The Rattlers (David Merrill on bass; Matty Quick on drums), and cut "Birdland with Lester Bangs". The recording took place at the under renovation Electric Lady Studios. Bassist David Merrill, who was working on the construction of the studio, had the keys to the building and they snuck the band in on April Fool's Day, 1979 for an impromptu and late night recording session. The result was a completely uncut and un-dubbed recording that displayed raw music. Birdland broke up within two months of this rare recording (in which the cassette tape from the session became the master, mixed by Ed Stasium and released by Leigh only in 1986).

Reviewing the 1986 LP "Birdland" with Lester Bangs, Robert Christgau gave it a B-plus and said, "musically he always had the instincts, and words were no problem."

In 1980 Lester Bangs traveled to Austin, Texas, where he met a surf/punk rock group, "The Delinquents". In early December of the same year, they recorded an album as "Lester Bangs and the Delinquents", titled Jook Savages on the Brazos, released the following year.

In 1990 the Mekons released the EP F.U.N. 90 with Bangs's declamation in the song "One Horse Town".

In popular culture

 Bangs is mentioned in the R.E.M. single "It's the End of the World as We Know It" from their 1987 album Document.
 Bangs is the subject of the song by Scott B. Sympathy "Lester Bangs Stereo Ghost" on the 1992 album Drinking With The Poet.
 Excerpts from an interview with Lester Bangs appeared in the last two episodes of Tony Palmer's seventeen-episode television documentary All You Need Is Love: The Story of Popular Music.
 The Ramones name check Bangs in their 1981 song "It's Not My Place"
 In the 2000 movie Almost Famous, directed by Cameron Crowe (himself a former writer for Rolling Stone), Bangs is portrayed by actor Philip Seymour Hoffman as a mentor to the film's protagonist William Miller. Bangs is also a major character in the 2019 stage musical version, in which he was played by Rob Colletti.
 The 2013 documentary A Box Full of Rocks: The El Cajon Years of Lester Bangs, directed by Raul Sandelin, discusses Bangs's childhood and formative writing career.
 In 2018 an Off-Broadway play about Bangs, How to Be a Rock Critic, premiered and was performed at several venues around the U.S. It starred Erik Jensen as Bangs, and was directed by Jessica Blank, with music by Steve Earle.
 Lester Bangs is a character in the short story "Dori Bangs" by Bruce Sterling in which Sterling imagines what would have happened if Lester hadn't died young and had instead met the artist Dori Seda.

Selected works

By Lester Bangs
 Review of The MC5's debut album, Kick Out The Jams  – Bangs's first piece for Rolling Stone
"How Long Will We Care?" Elvis Presley obituary. The Village Voice, August 29, 1977
 "The Greatest Album Ever Made", Creem magazine (1976) — about the 1975 Lou Reed album Metal Machine Music
 "Stranded", (1979) — about the 1968 album Astral Weeks, by Van Morrison
 Blondie, Fireside Book, 1980. ISBN 0-671-25540-1, 91 p.
 Rod Stewart, Paul Nelson & Lester Bangs, Putnam Group, 1981. ISBN 0-933-38808-7, 159 p.
 Psychotic Reactions and Carburetor Dung: The Work of a Legendary Critic, collected writings, Greil Marcus, ed. Anchor Press, 1988.
 Main Lines, Blood Feasts, and Bad Taste: A Lester Bangs Reader, collected writings, John Morthland, ed. Anchor Press, 2003.

About Lester Bangs
 Let it Blurt: The Life and Times of Lester Bangs, America's Greatest Rock Critic, biography, Jim Derogatis. Broadway Books, 2000..
 How To Be A Rock Critic, play, Jessica Blank and Erik Jensen. Kirk Douglas Theater, Steppenwolf Theatre Company, Public Theater, more; 2015–2018.

Works citing Lester Bangs
 Please Kill Me: The Uncensored Oral History of Punk, biography, Legs McNeil and Gillian McCain. Penguin Books, 1997..

See also 
Jeffrey Morgan
Greil Marcus
Dave Marsh
Greg Shaw
Lenny Kaye
Robert Christgau
Jann Wenner
Ellen Willis

References

Notes

Sources

External links

  by Jeffrey Morgan of Creem.
 1980 interview with Bangs posted at rockcritics.com
 May 13, 1980 Interview with Lester Bangs  by Sue Mathews of ABC Radio (Australia) Complete transcript plus MP3 stream of the interview.
 Richard Hell remembers Lester Bangs  in The Village Voice, August 7, 2003
 

American music critics
American music journalists
Rock critics
1948 births
1982 deaths
American male journalists
Journalists from California
Rolling Stone people
People from El Cajon, California
People from Escondido, California
Accidental deaths in New York (state)
Drug-related deaths in New York City
20th-century American journalists